"John Deere Tractor" is a song written by Lawrence John Hammond (as L. John Hammond) and recorded by American country music duo The Judds. It was first released on their 1984 debut EP, Wynonna & Naomi. New vocals were recorded over the original instrumental in 1990 for their final album, Love Can Build a Bridge. This version was included on Greatest Hits Volume Two and released as a single in July 1991, peaking at number 29 on the Billboard Hot Country Songs chart.

But the song received its big boost to worldwide fame when Larry Sparks recorded it as a Bluegrass song in 1980 as the title song on his John Deere Tractor album for Rebel Records. It shot to the top of the Bluegrass charts and has consistently been a leading standard on Bluegrass radio and recorded and played by dozens of other Bluegrass performers ever since.  

In 2022, bluegrass artist Billy Strings recorded a version of  "John Deere Tractor"  for his album Me / And / Dad.

Chart performance

References

1991 singles
1984 songs
The Judds songs
Song recordings produced by Brent Maher
RCA Records singles
Curb Records singles